Sjöholm is a Swedish surname.

Geographical distribution
As of 2014, 72.4% of all known bearers of the surname Sjöholm were residents of Sweden (frequency 1:2,953) and 26.3% of Finland (1:4,535).

In Sweden, the frequency of the surname was higher than national average (1:2,953) in the following counties:
 1. Skåne County (1:1,418)
 2. Blekinge County (1:1,480)
 3. Örebro County (1:2,128)
 4. Halland County (1:2,614)
 5. Östergötland County (1:2,652)

In Finland, the frequency of the surname was higher than national average (1:4,535) in the following regions:
 1. Ostrobothnia (1:1,121)
 2. Åland (1:1,196)
 3. Southwest Finland (1:1,435)
 4. Uusimaa (1:3,019)
 5. Satakunta (1:3,186)
 6. South Karelia (1:4,206)

People
Anders Sjöholm, Swedish musician 
Helen Sjöholm, Swedish singer and actress
Joel Sjöholm, Swedish golfer

References

Surnames
Swedish-language surnames